Elmwood Park Community Unit School District 401 (EPCUSD 401) is a school district headquartered in Elmwood Park, Illinois.

In 2019 the board approved a new infrastructure plan that voters were to vote on in a referendum worth $55 million held on March 17, 2020.

Schools
 Secondary schools
 Elmwood Park High School (9-12)
 Elm Middle School (7-8)
 Elementary schools (1-6)
 Elmwood Elementary School
 John Mills Elementary School

References

External links
 

School districts in Cook County, Illinois